CGL may refer to:

Cambridge Greek Lexicon
Carrier Grade Linux
Catalyst Game Labs
Core OpenGL: Apple Computer's Macintosh Quartz windowing system interface to the Mac OS X implementation of the OpenGL specification
Conway's Game of Life
Chengalpattu Junction railway station (station code), in Tamil Nadu, India
Chronic granulocytic leukemia, also known as Chronic myelogenous leukemia
Confederazione Generale del Lavoro
Commercial General Liability, a common type of liability insurance
CGL (charity)